Rizen is a two-time Stellar Award–winning gospel music group that records both traditional and contemporary music.  It currently consist of Adriann Lewis-Freeman and Aundrea Roeshell Lewis, Kanika Trigg and Ashley Griffith.

Biography

Early lives

RiZen was formed in the 1997.

Recordings and awards
RiZen, consisting of Adriann and Aundrea Lewis, Kanika Trigg, and Ashley Jones, released its self-titled with Light Records CD RiZen in 2003. The group won a Stellar Award in 2004 for Best New Artist.

RiZen's second CD, also with Light Records RiZen2, (Griffin left the group for personal reasons)was released in 2005. According to Adriann, RiZen 2 is more of RiZen and has a lot to do with the girls' personal experiences.  After the release of RiZen 2”, Trigg stepped away from the group, leaving it a duo of the Lewis sisters.  RiZen won a Stellar Award in 2006 for Best Traditional Group/Duo.

RiZen's third CD, released in 2009 Free, under the Verity Label was produced by urban gospel label artist Fred Hammond, as well as by Aaron Lindsey, Daniel Weatherspoon and RiZen musical director, Ay’Ron Lewis.

RiZen is in the midst of their comeback.  All four are back in the fold. They have secured many dates which they are calling The RiZen Reunion Tour!  They have comeback with “He’ll Be There” which had very good radio and consumption response.  RiZen is now under Joint Partnership with DAF Entertainment Group (which is led by Adriann’s Husband Darin Freeman) & Tyscot Records.  They are looking forward to 2023 where RiZen will be promoting a Remix of “View The City”.  

They are currently writing and in the studio for future projects.  Stay tuned!

 Discography 

 Albums 
 Rizen (2003)
 RiZen 2 (2005)
 Free (2009)
 Free Remixes'' (2010)

Singles 
 "View the City" (2003)
 “You’ve Done So Much/We Worship You” (2003)
 "Trust and Never Doubt" (2004)
 "We've Come To Magnify the Lord" (2005)
 "Free" (2009)
 "He'll Make A Way" (2010)
 "Just For Me (He Did It)" (2010)
 "He’ll Be There"(2020)
 “View The City” - REMIX (2023)

Songs in Other Projects 
 "View the city - from (Stellar award hits) (Integrity Gospel/Sony Gospel/Epic, 2004)
 "Lift up Jesus" - from (Sistas in the spirit) (Integrity/Columbia, 2006)
 "Never Doubt Him (Live)" (From Sisters in the spirit) (Central South, 2008)

Videography 
 Rizen (Live) (2004)
 Donna Richardson Joyner's Sweating In The Spirit 2 (2006)
 Sisters in the spirit (2008)

References

External links
 Rizen's Official Website (and source of biography)
 Verity Records Official Website(rizen's label and source of biography)
 [ Billboard]

Musical groups established in 1995
American gospel musical groups
African-American girl groups
American gospel singers